Yves Trudeau  (December 3, 1930 – December 18, 2017) was a Canadian sculptor and a prominent figure in 20th-century art in Quebec, especially public art.

Life and career
Yves Trudeau studied at the École des Beaux-Arts de Montréal and began his career in the 1950s. At first concentrating on bronze sculptures, he later incorporated wood and iron into his works.

In 1960, he founded the Association des sculpteurs du Québec (today the Conseil de la sculpture du Québec), a professional association for Quebec sculptors. He created numerous significant public sculptures and took part in significant group and individual shows throughout Canada and Europe.

He received the Order of Canada in 1995.

Major public works

References

External links
"Yves Trudeau (Canadian, 1930)", Artnet

1930 births
2017 deaths
Canadian sculptors
Canadian male sculptors
Members of the Order of Canada
Montreal Metro artists
École des beaux-arts de Montréal alumni
French Quebecers
Artists from Montreal
Members of the Royal Canadian Academy of Arts